The 1907 ECAHA season was the second season of the Eastern Canada Amateur Hockey Association (ECAHA). Teams played a ten-game schedule. The Montreal Wanderers won the league championship going undefeated, with their only loss of the season coming in a Stanley Cup challenge series with Kenora.

League business

Executive 
 Fred McRobie (President)
 Thomas D'Arcy McGee, Ottawa (1st Vice-President)
 Gordon Blair, Quebec (2nd Vice-President)
 Emmett Quinn, Shamrocks (Secretary-Treasurer)

Nationals and Grand Trunk applied for franchises but did not get three-fourths approval.

Rule changes 
 Teams could have professionals as well as amateurs
 After a puck strikes a goalie, the rebound could now be played by the defending team without it being called offside
 A player injured in the first half can sit for ten minutes and the other team has to take off a player.

Regular season 
Frank McGee of Ottawa retired to pursue his government career. The Wanderers added two professionals, Riley Hern from the Portage Lake-Houghton pros and Hod Stuart from the Pittsburgh pros.

Prior to the season, Ottawa travelled to Winnipeg for a series of exhibition games against Manitoba league teams including the Kenora Thistles, who then came east to play a challenge in Montreal. The Montreal Victorias hosted the St. Nicholas Hockey Club from New York in an exhibition on December 22, 1906, defeating them 16–3.

Highlights 

A major battle took place for the game between the Senators and Wanderers on January 12. Stick work was the order of the day as Charles Spittal of Ottawa knocked Cecil Blachford in the head, Alf Smith hit Hod Stuart in the head and Harry Smith broke Ernie Johnson's nose. The Wanderers would still win, 4–2.

After the game, a special league meeting was called to hand out discipline, with Victorias and Wanderers wanting Spittal and Alf Smith suspended for the season. The players were not suspended, leading the league president Mr. McRobie to resign, leaving Darcy McGee to take over as president.

On the next visit of the Ottawa team to Montreal, to play the Victorias, the three Ottawa players were arrested by Montreal police. Eventually Alf Smith and Spittal were fined $20 for their actions and Harry Smith was found not guilty.

The scoring championship was close, with Ernie Russell of the Wanderers placing first with 42 goals in 9 games, and Russell Bowie scoring 38 in 10 games.

Final standings

Stanley Cup challenges 
The 1907 season had two Stanley Cup champions, Montreal Wanderers and Kenora Thistles.

Wanderers vs. New Glasgow at Montreal 

The Wanderers played one Stanley Cup challenge before the season, defeating the New Glasgow Cubs in a two-game series 10–3, 7–2, December 27–29, 1906. This was the first series in which professional players played for the Stanley Cup, as the Wanderers and other teams in the ECAHA were starting to mix amateurs with pros in their squads.

Wanderers vs. Kenora at Montreal 

The Wanderers played one Stanley Cup challenge during the season, losing to the Kenora Thistles 2–4, 6–8 on January 17–21. Aided by future Hockey Hall of Famers Joe Hall, Tom Hooper, Tommy Phillips, and Art Ross, the Thistles came away with 4–2 and 8–6 victories for a combined score of 12–8 to win a two-game total goals series. Hall and Ross were borrowed from the Brandon Wheat City team.

For Montreal, these were their first games after their donnybrook with Ottawa on January 12. Centre Cecil Blachford, who had been knocked out in the Ottawa game, did not play. Johnson and Stuart, who had required hospitalization, did play. Ernie Russell substituted for Blachford.

Source: Ottawa Citizen

Source: Ottawa Citizen

After the series, the Thistles played an exhibition game in Ottawa on January 23. The Thistles lost 8–3 to Ottawa. Harry Smith scored four goals and Harry Westwick scored three for Ottawa. In this game Billy McGimsie suffered a career-ending shoulder injury.

Brandon Wheat City vs. Kenora Thistles at Winnipeg 
After returning home, Kenora had played the balance of the MPHL season. Montreal Wanderers won the ECAHA regular-season champions and challenged to regain the Stanley Cup. Challenge was excepted. However Brandon and Kenora finished tied for first in the Manitoba League. So a best of three game series was upset to see who the Manitoba League Champion and who defended the cup again the Montreal Wanderers. After losing McGimsie, Si Griffis and Tom Hooper also went down to injury. Kenora signed three players to bolster its team: Alf Smith and Rat Westwick of Ottawa, and Fred Whitcroft of Peterborough to finish the season. (All three were future Hall of Fame inductees.) By the time of the MPHL playoff, Stanley Cup trustee William Foran notified Kenora that Smith and Westwick were ineligible for the challenge.

Playoff 
Kenora would play and win the MPHL playoff against Brandon to successfully defend the Cup, winning a best-of-three series 2–0. Hall and Ross played for Brandon in the series, while Smith, Westwick and Whitcroft played for the Thistles. At the time of the series, the acting Stanley Cup trustee William Foran had already declared Smith and Westwick ineligible for the challenge series. After the series was over, the Manitoba League registered their disapproval over Mr. Foran's decision to exclude the players.

- Goal scorers in both games are unknown.

Montreal Wanderers vs. Kenora Thistles at Winnipeg 

Kenora dressed Smith and Westwick for the challenge anyway and Montreal filed a protest with Foran. Foran ruled that both players were ineligible. The series was supposed to start on March 20 in Kenora but did not. One report was that the ice in the rink was too poor to play on and the rink was closed. The clubs went ahead and started the series on March 23 in Winnipeg instead, with Smith and Westwick playing. Foran was notified by the press (inaccurately) that Montreal had dropped its protest and that the clubs intended to play anyway. Foran threatened to take the Cup back to Ottawa:

If the two clubs ignore the instructions of the cup trustees by mutually agreeing to play against Westwick and Smith when both were positively informed these men were ineligible to participate in the present cup matches, the series will be treated as void, and the cup will be taken charge of by the trustees. It will remain in their possession till the various hockey leagues can educate themselves up to a standard where decent sport will be the order of the day.”

The teams went ahead and played the series. However, Foran changed his mind after the Wanderers won the Cup, stating that the Wanderers could keep the Cup, because they had not rescinded their protest.

After the series, the Wanderers returned to Montreal with the Stanley Cup. The Cup was stolen from Montreal photographer Jimmy Rice's home and held for ransom. No ransom was paid, and the Cup was returned to Rice. It was used as a geranium planter until the fall.

Schedule and results 

† Wanderers clinch league championship.

Player statistics

Goaltending averages 
Note: GP = Games played, GA = goals against, SO = Shutouts, GAA = Goals against average

Leading scorers

Stanley Cup engravings 
The 1907 Stanley Cup was presented twice by the trophy's trustee William Foran.

The Thistles never did engrave their names on the Cup for their championship season just team name inside the bowl, while the Wanderers engraved their names on the Cup.

The following Thistles players and staff were members of the winning team.

1907 Kenora Thistles

See also 
 1906–07 MPHL season
 Eastern Canadian Amateur Hockey Association
 List of pre-NHL seasons
 List of ice hockey leagues
 List of Stanley Cup champions

References

Citations

Sources 

 
 Podnieks, Andrew: Lord Stanley Cup, Fenn Publishing Company, 2004
 
 Adams, Trevor J.: Long Shots, Nimbus Publishing, 2012

ECHA season
Eastern Canada Amateur Hockey Association seasons